The 53rd Street Library is a branch of the New York Public Library at 18 West 53rd Street, just west of Fifth Avenue in Midtown Manhattan. The library is composed of three floors, including two basement levels, and contains a glass facade. The building is located on the south side of 53rd Street, across from the Museum of Modern Art, and located adjacent to 666 Fifth Avenue to the east. It opened in 2016 as a replacement for the Donnell Library Center, which occupied a building at 20 West 53rd Street. The Donnell Library Center operated from 1955 until 2008, when its building was razed and a 46-story hotel and residential building constructed on the site.

Donnell Library Center 

The Donnell Library Center was a branch of the New York Public Library at 20 West 53rd Street. It closed on August 30, 2008.

The library was famous for housing the collection of the original Winnie the Pooh dolls behind bulletproof glass in a display in the Children’s Reading Room.

The branch also had the largest New York Public Library circulating collection of materials in languages other than English. It also featured the largest collection in the library system of magazines, hardcover, paperback and recorded books for seventh through twelfth grades in the balcony Nathan Straus Young Adult Center. The auditorium in the basement offered concerts and other cultural events.

The library opened in 1955 and cost $2.5 million, including the books. It is named for Ezekial J. Donnell (1822–1896), a cotton merchant who was an early library patron. Its exterior was clad in Indiana Limestone. It was designed by Edgar I. Williams and Aymar Embury II. The formal name carved in the limestone above the entrance was "The Donnell Free Circulation Library and Reading Room."

Redevelopment 
The five-story library, two blocks north of Rockefeller Center, was located across 53rd Street from the Museum of Modern Art, another relatively low-rise mid-block building among many taller Midtown Manhattan buildings along nearby Fifth Avenue and Sixth Avenue.

In November 2007 Orient-Express Hotels Ltd. which owns the 21 Club directly south of the library on 52nd Street, announced an agreement to raze the library and replace it with an 11-story hotel. At that time, the library was unable to afford the expense of needed repairs to its elevator and air conditioning systems. The library was vacated in the summer of 2008. The World Languages Collection moved to the Mid-Manhattan Library on 40th Street.

In March 2009, after the financial crisis of 2007–08, Orient Express backed out. In October 2011, demolition began on the building after Orient sold the building to Tribeca Associates and Starwood Capital Group, to erect a 46-story $400 million hotel/condo complex with a library. Originally supposed to open by June 30, 2014, it opened in March 2015 without a library. It was planned to be the flagship of the new Baccarat Hotels and Resorts luxury brand. It was later sold to Chinese insurer Sunshine Insurance Group for $230 million.

The formal design by Enrique Norten of TEN Arquitectos of the new library was unveiled in May 2013. Much of the main floor space is a massive airy staircase with "bleacher steps" where people can sit and congregate. The new library has a 141-seat auditorium (smaller than the old) and a technology hub. The building contains a two-story-high glass facade. It opened June 27, 2016. Critics spoke highly of the new design but disapproved the smaller size.

Winnie the Pooh dolls 

In the 1940s Pooh author A. A. Milne donated the dolls to the American publisher E. P. Dutton. The dolls were then donated to the library in 1988. In 1998 British Member of Parliament Gwyneth Dunwoody urged that the dolls be returned to the British Parliament.

Mayor Rudolph W. Giuliani came to their defense. The mayor, after the visiting the library, and holding the bear with a group of children proclaimed in a "leaked" conversation that the bear told him "I want everyone in Britain and America to know that we're very, very happy here in New York City" and that it had also lauded the city's drop in crime and thought New York "capital of the world."

Congresswoman Nita M. Lowey said "The Brits have their head in a honey jar if they think they are taking Pooh out of New York City." Mike McCurry, spokesman for Bill Clinton said "As the President indicated to some of us, the notion that the United States would lose Winnie is utterly unbearable."

According to the New York Public Library's web site, the dolls were relocated to "grand new quarters in the History and Social Science Library" at the Main Branch, where they were shown in the Children’s Room.

References

External links

Library buildings completed in 1955
New York Public Library branches in Manhattan
Midtown Manhattan
1955 establishments in New York City